Goat Mountain is a  mountain summit located in the Chugach Mountains, in Anchorage Municipality in the U.S. state of Alaska. The mountain's name was officially adopted in 1932. On August 4, 2019, a small airplane crashed on the mountain claiming all four lives onboard.

Climate

Based on the Köppen climate classification,  Goat Mountain is located in a subarctic climate zone with long, cold, snowy winters, and mild summers. Temperatures can drop below −20 °C with wind chill factors below −30 °C. This climate supports the massive Eagle Glacier on the east aspect of the peak, the Milk Glacier on the western slope, and the Raven Glacier to the northwest.

See also
List of mountain peaks of Alaska
Geology of Alaska

References

External links

 Goat Mountain weather forecast
 Plane crash on Goat Mountain claims four lives: Anchorage Daily News
 Crash victims identified

Mountains of Alaska
Mountains of Anchorage, Alaska
North American 1000 m summits